Catherine Burns (September 25, 1945 – February 2, 2019) was an American actress of stage, film, radio and television. She was nominated for an Academy Award for Best Supporting Actress for her performance in Last Summer (1969).

Early years 
Born in New York City of Irish and Polish heritage, Burns was raised in Manhattan, and attended Hunter College High School, Hunter College and the American Academy of Dramatic Arts.

Career
Burns's professional acting debut occurred in David Susskind's TV production of The Crucible (1967). She made her Broadway debut in 1968 in The Prime of Miss Jean Brodie, for which she received the Clarence Derwent Award. She also appeared in Operation Sidewinder (1970) on Broadway.

Burns made her screen debut in 1969 in Last Summer as sensitive, conservative Rhoda, receiving critical acclaim and a nomination for the Academy Award for Best Supporting Actress. Despite the recognition, Burns never appeared in another theatrically released film after 1971, when she was just 26 years of age.

Her other film credits include Me, Natalie (1969) and Red Sky at Morning (1971).

Television
Burns's television debut was the role of Mary Warren in Arthur Miller's The Crucible (1967). She went on to appear as the original Cathy Craig on One Life to Live in 1969. Her other TV credits include the adaptation of Arthur Miller's play A Memory of Two Mondays (1974), the miniseries The Word (1978), and guest appearances on Love, American Style; Adam-12; Emergency!; The Mod Squad; Police Woman; The Waltons; and The Bionic Woman. She continued on television throughout the 1970s and into the mid-1980s when she turned from acting to writing.

Writing
Her children's book, The Winter Bird, was published by Windmill Books in 1971. Staying behind when other birds go south for the winter, a little bird discovers a new way of life in the unusual world of carousel horses. She also wrote screenplays and stage plays, and sold scripts to the CBS soap opera Guiding Light in 1989.

Personal life and death 
In June 1989, Burns married Kenneth Shire. At the time, she lived on the Upper West Side of Manhattan. Later in her life, she and Shire resided in a retirement community in Lynden, Washington. Little is known about Burns' life following her acting career; Shire said that she had resented the publicity and scrutiny from it, saying "She hated the movie [Last Summer]...  and most everything that came with it. She wanted to be remembered as a published writer of novels."

A 2020 article in The Hollywood Reporter found that, according to Washington state health records, Burns died at age 73 on February 2, 2019, from  complications of a fall she had suffered at home, with cirrhosis listed as a contributing factor.

References

External links

1945 births
2019 deaths
20th-century American actresses
20th-century American women writers
Accidental deaths from falls
Accidental deaths in Washington (state)
Actresses from New York City
American film actresses
American people of Irish descent
American people of Polish descent
American television actresses
Deaths from cirrhosis
People from Lynden, Washington
People from the Upper West Side
Writers from Manhattan
21st-century American women